Bradford is a city in White County, Arkansas, United States. The population was 759 at the 2010 census.

Geography

Demographics

As of the census of 2000, there were 800 people, 351 households, and 222 families residing in the city. The racial makeup of the city was 98.75% White, 0.12% Black or African American, 0.62% Native American, 0.25% from other races, and 0.25% from two or more races.  1.38% of the population were Hispanic or Latino of any race.

There were 351 households, out of which 25.9% had children under the age of 18 living with them, 43.3% were married couples living together, 15.1% had a female householder with no husband present, and 36.5% were non-families. 32.2% of all households were made up of individuals, and 17.4% had someone living alone who was 65 years of age or older.  The average household size was 2.28 and the average family size was 2.83.

In the city, the population was spread out, with 23.5% under the age of 18, 9.3% from 18 to 24, 25.3% from 25 to 44, 21.3% from 45 to 64, and 20.8% who were 65 years of age or older.  The median age was 39 years. For every 100 females, there were 88.7 males.  For every 100 females age 18 and over, there were 83.8 males.

The median income for a household in the city was $22,381, and the median income for a family was $29,479. Males had a median income of $24,400 versus $18,214 for females. The per capita income for the city was $12,953.  About 8.4% of families and 18.7% of the population were below the poverty line, including 23.3% of those under age 18 and 14.9% of those age 65 or over.

Government
There are seven city council members.  The mayor is Dennis Whitener.

Education 
Public education for early childhood, elementary and secondary students is primarily provided by the Bradford School District, which leads to graduation from Bradford High School.

References

External links
 Encyclopedia of Arkansas History & Culture

Cities in Arkansas
Cities in White County, Arkansas